The canton of Bellerive-sur-Allier is an administrative division of the Allier department, in central France. It was created at the French canton reorganisation which came into effect in March 2015. Its seat is in Bellerive-sur-Allier.

It consists of the following communes: 
 
Bellerive-sur-Allier 
Broût-Vernet
Brugheas
Cognat-Lyonne
Escurolles
Espinasse-Vozelle
Hauterive
Saint-Didier-la-Forêt
Saint-Pont
Serbannes
Vendat

References

Cantons of Allier